Thankful is the fifth studio album by Canadian country music singer Aaron Pritchett. It was released on September 9, 2008 by 604 Records. The album's first three singles charted on the Canadian Hot 100.

Track listing

Chart performance

Singles

2008 albums
604 Records albums
Aaron Pritchett albums